Minsheng is a Chinese word for "the people's wealth-fare". The word appeared in ancient book such as Zuo zhuan, but most notably as one of the Three Principles of the People. It may also refer to:

Companies
 China Minsheng Bank, a Chinese commercial bank
 Minsheng Bank Building
 Minsheng Life Insurance, a Chinese life insurance company
 China Minsheng Trust, a Chinese trust and investment management company, subsidiary of Oceanwide Holdings
 Minsheng Securities, a Chinese investment bank and brokerage firm, subsidiary of Oceanwide Holdings
 Minsheng Holdings, A Chinese publicly traded company, subsidiary of Oceanwide Group